The Autumns is the third studio album by the indie rock band The Autumns. It was released in 2004 on Pseudopod Records. The release was long-awaited, as the recording process was lengthy. In the meantime, bassist Brian Stearns exited the band, and was replaced by Dustin Morgan. An additional guitarist, Ken Tighe, was added to the lineup.

Track listing
All songs by The Autumns.

"The End"
"Hush, Plain Girls"
"Deathly Little Dreams"
"Desole"
"Flies in the Eyes of the Queen"
"Every Sunday Sky"
"Slumberdoll"
"Edmond & Edward"
"Wish Stars"
"The Moon Softly Weeps a Lullabye"
"Cattleya"
"Wonderfully Wonderful"
"Heartsick on the Open Sea"

References

2004 albums
The Autumns albums
Bella Union albums